is a railway station on the Chūō Main Line in the city of Chino, Nagano, Japan, operated by East Japan Railway Company (JR East).

Lines
Chino Station is served by the Chūō Main Line, and is 195.2 kilometers from the terminus of the line at Tokyo Station.

Station layout
The station consists of one ground level side platform and one ground level island platform, connected by a footbridge. The station has a Midori no Madoguchi staffed ticket office. A JNR Class C12 steam locomotive is preserved in the plaza outside the station's east entrance.

Platforms

Bus terminal

Highway buses
 Chūō Kōsoku Bus; For Shinjuku Station
 Alpen Suwa; For Kyoto Station, Momoyamadai Station, Shin-Ōsaka Station, and Umeda Station

Route buses
JR BUS
For Takatō Bus Terminal, Senryuso
Alpico Kotsu
For Mugikusa Pass
For Lake Shirakaba
For Shimo-Suwa Station

History
Chino Station opened on 25 November 1905. With the privatization of Japanese National Railways (JNR) on 1 April 1987, the station came under the control of JR East.

Passenger statistics
In fiscal 2015, the station was used by an average of 3,715 passengers daily (boarding passengers only).

Surrounding area
Chino City Hall
Tokyo University of Science, Suwa

See also
 List of railway stations in Japan

References

External links

 JR East station information 

Railway stations in Nagano Prefecture
Railway stations in Japan opened in 1905
Stations of East Japan Railway Company
Chūō Main Line
Chino, Nagano